The following is a list of FCC-licensed radio stations in the U.S. state of Maryland which can be sorted by their call signs, frequencies, cities of license, licensees, and programming formats.

List of radio stations

Defunct
 WBIS
 WGBG
 WHFS (historic)
 WHRF
 WRYR-LP

See also
 Maryland media
 List of newspapers in Maryland
 List of television stations in Maryland
 Media of locales in Maryland: Baltimore, College Park, Cumberland, Frederick, Gaithersburg

References

Bibliography

External links

  (Directory ceased in 2017)
 Maryland, DC, Delaware Broadcasters Association
 W3EAX Amateur Radio Association, University of Maryland (est. circa 1934)
 Mid-Atlantic Antique Radio Club

Images

 
Maryland
Radio